The year 1629 in science and technology involved some significant events.

Botany
 In London, John Parkinson publishes .

Chemistry
 English alchemist Arthur Dee, court physician to Michael I of Russia, compiles Fasciculus Chemicus, Chymical Collections. Expressing the Ingress, Progress, and Egress, of the Secret Hermetick Science out of the choicest and most famous authors.

Medicine
 Plague breaks out in Mantua and spreads to Milan.
 In Toulouse, Niall Ó Glacáin publishes Tractatus de Peste.

Technology

 In Rome, Giovanni Branca publishes .

Births
 April 14 – Christiaan Huygens, Dutch mathematician and physicist (died 1695)
 Laurent Cassegrain, French priest and physicist (died 1693)
 Jan Commelijn, Dutch botanist (died 1692)
 Christophe Glaser, Swiss pharmacian (died 1672)
 Johann Glaser, Swiss anatomist (died 1675)
 Agnes Block, Dutch horticulturalist (died 1704)

Deaths
 July 13 – Caspar Bartholin the Elder, Danish polymath, physician and theologian (born 1585)
 Giovanni Faber, German papal doctor and botanist (born 1574)

References

 
17th century in science
1620s in science